The Cove Creek Bridge was a historic bridge in rural eastern Conway County, Arkansas. It carried Arkansas Highway 124 across Cove Creek, just west of the hamlet of Martinsville, and west of the city of Twin Groves. The bridge was built in 1957, and was the one of few Pratt truss bridges in the state.

The bridge was listed on the National Register of Historic Places in 2004. It was replaced in 2011, and was delisted from the National Register in 2017.

See also
Cove Creek Bridge (Corley, Arkansas)
Cove Creek Tributary Bridge
Cove Lake Spillway Dam-Bridge
National Register of Historic Places listings in Conway County, Arkansas
List of bridges on the National Register of Historic Places in Arkansas

References

Road bridges on the National Register of Historic Places in Arkansas
Bridges completed in 1957
National Register of Historic Places in Conway County, Arkansas
Former National Register of Historic Places in Arkansas
Steel bridges in the United States
Pratt truss bridges in the United States
1957 establishments in Arkansas
Transportation in Conway County, Arkansas
2004 disestablishments in Arkansas
Demolished bridges in the United States
Demolished buildings and structures in Arkansas